House on Haunted Hill is a 1959 American horror film produced and directed by William Castle, written by Robb White and starring Vincent Price, Carol Ohmart, Richard Long, Alan Marshal, Carolyn Craig and Elisha Cook Jr. Price plays an eccentric millionaire, Frederick Loren, who, along with his wife Annabelle, has invited five people to the house for a "haunted house" party. Whoever stays in the house for one night will earn $10,000. As the night progresses, the guests are trapped within the house with an assortment of terrors.

The film uses many props used in carnival haunted houses to generate fear and terror. The film is in the public domain.

Plot
Frederick Loren, an eccentric millionaire, invites five people to a party he is throwing for his fourth wife, Annabelle, in an allegedly haunted house he has rented. He promises to give each guest $10,000 with the stipulation that they stay the entire night in the house after the doors are locked at midnight, all the windows are barred, and there are no phones or radios to use. The guests are test pilot Lance Schroeder, newspaper columnist Ruth Bridges, psychiatrist Dr. David Trent, who specializes in hysteria, Nora Manning, who works for one of Loren's companies, and the house's owner, Watson Pritchard. All are strangers to both the Lorens and each other, their only commonality being their lust for money.

The Lorens have a tense relationship. Frederick is convinced Annabelle tried to poison him to acquire his wealth, which Annabelle somewhat evasively denies, attributing his suspicions to paranoia and jealousy. Watson believes the house is genuinely haunted by the ghosts of those murdered there, including his own brother; he claims to have spent one night there before and "was almost dead" when found the next morning. He gives a tour of the house, including a vat of acid in the basement, which a previous resident used to kill his wife. When Lance and Nora remain behind to further explore the basement, Lance is locked in an empty room and struck on the head, while a menacing ghost confronts Nora.

Annabelle privately warns Lance that her husband is scheming something and that she suspects him of murdering his second and third wives after his first wife disappeared. The guests learn the party's rules downstairs, and each is given a Colt Model 1903 Pocket Hammer for protection. Having encountered further apparitions, Nora decides against staying the night, but the caretakers lock the doors five minutes early, taking that option out of the guests' hands.

Hearing a scream, Lance and David find Annabelle's corpse, suspended to suggest she hanged herself, but the absence of a perch immediately arouses suspicions of murder. Nora confronts Lance and tells him an unseen assailant strangled her and left her for dead. In light of Annabelle's warnings, they both suspect Frederick. He tells her to remain out of sight so that her attacker will still think she is dead. Lance and David propose that everyone stay in their rooms and shoot anyone who enters to survive the night. Thus the innocents will have no reason to leave their rooms (and a good reason to stay inside them) and the killer must stay put or admit guilt.

Nora is chased from her room into the basement by Annabelle's ghost. Aroused by the ghostly sounds, David concludes that the killer is about and proposes he and Frederick split up to search the house. Lance uncovers a secret room at the end of the second-floor hall, but the door shuts behind him once he enters, trapping him. David instead meets with Annabelle, who had faked her death using a hanging harness and sedatives. Secretly lovers, the two of them have orchestrated the various mishaps to manipulate Nora into killing Frederick. Nora, seeing Frederick enter the basement with a gun in his hand, does indeed shoot him. After she flees, David slips in to dispose of Frederick's body in the vat of acid, and the lights go out.

Annabelle walks to the basement to confirm her husband is dead. A skeleton rises from the acid, accuses her in Frederick's voice, and shoves her into the vat. Frederick emerges from the shadows, holding the puppeteer control unit that he used to manipulate the skeleton and revealing he had known their plot all along.

After Nora, Watson, and Ruth release Lance from the secret room, Nora tells them that she shot Frederick. When they arrive in the cellar, Frederick explains that he loaded her gun with blanks, that his wife and David plotted to kill him, and that they both met their ends in the vat of acid. He says he is ready for justice to decide if he's innocent or guilty. Watson remains convinced the house is haunted, with David and Annabelle now added to its ranks of ghosts, and that he will be the next victim.

Cast

 Vincent Price as Frederick Loren
 Carol Ohmart as Annabelle Loren
 Richard Long as Lance Schroeder
 Alan Marshal as Dr. David Trent
 Carolyn Craig as Nora Manning
 Elisha Cook Jr. as Watson Pritchard (credited as Elisha Cook)
 Julie Mitchum as Ruth Bridgers
 Leona Anderson as Mrs. Slydes
 Howard Hoffman as Jonas Slydes
 Skeleton as Himself

Production

Exterior shots of the house were filmed at the historic Ennis House in Los Feliz California, designed by Frank Lloyd Wright and built in 1924. The bulk of the film was shot on sound stages, depicting the interior of the house in a combination of styles, including 1890s Victorian, with gas chandeliers and sconces. The poster for the film included an illustration of a house in yet a third style, that of a fanciful four-story Romanesque structure.

The theatrical trailer promoted the film as The House on Haunted Hill, although all advertising material and the title on the film itself were simply titled House on Haunted Hill.

The film is perhaps best known for a promotional gimmick used in the film's original theatrical release called "Emergo." In some theaters that showed the film, exhibitors rigged an elaborate pulley system near the theater screen which allowed a plastic skeleton to be flown over the audience during a corresponding scene late in the film. (Several modern repertory cinemas including the Film Forum and Loew's Jersey Theatre have hosted revival screenings of the film during which the "Emergo" gimmick has been recreated.)

Thanks in part to Castle's gimmickry, the film was a huge success. Alfred Hitchcock took notice of the low-budget film's performance at the box office and made his own low-budget horror film, which became the critically acclaimed hit Psycho (1960). Castle was himself a Hitchcock fan and would try to imitate Hitchcock's work in later films such as Homicidal (1961).

The production of the film had been partly inspired by the success of Shirley Jackson's book, "The Haunting of Hill House", which had been released earlier that year. Notably, the film's title is a reworking of Jackson's book title, and both reference the same subject. The value of books had been keen on William Castle's mind. When Ira Levin's "Rosemary's Baby" had been in the proof stage, Castle raised the money to purchase the movie rights. He instinctively knew it would become a valuable property that he could produce and direct. Although he wasn't able to direct it, he was able to both negotiate a deal to produce that film, and produce other movies for the same studio.

It was reported that Carol Ohmart was supposed to record the theme in the opening credits, but the idea was scrapped.

Release

House on Haunted Hill was originally released theatrically by Allied Artists. Lorimar Productions released this film for VHS cassette on CBS/Fox Video's Key Video in October, 1985. Two major studios have released the film on home video in remastered versions. Warner Home Video released the film on DVD as a tie-in to the release of the 1999 remake. In 2005, the film was colorized by Legend Films. The color version was released on DVD the same year by 20th Century Fox. Extras prepared by Legend Films for the Fox DVD release included an audio commentary track by comedian Michael J. Nelson of Mystery Science Theater 3000, two versions of the trailer and a slideshow of images from the film's original press book.

Johnny Legend released a 50th anniversary DVD containing many extras such as both the original theatrical trailer and TV spots plus several William Castle and Vincent Price theatrical trailers, a Carol Ohmart profile and "golden age" TV shows starring Vincent Price. A DivX file of the colorized version with the commentary embedded is available as part of Nelson's RiffTrax On Demand service. In 2009, a newly recorded commentary by Nelson, Kevin Murphy and Bill Corbett was released by RiffTrax. The RiffTrax team performed a Live RiffTrax of House on Haunted Hill on 28 October 2010.

House on Haunted Hill was released in a restored Blu-ray edition as part of Shout! Factory's 2014 Vincent Price Collection II.

On 28 September 2011, the estate of William Castle released an annotated screenplay from House on Haunted Hill which is a copy of the shooting script along with Castle's "margin notes" and the leather-bound style Castle used for his shooting script. This edition includes introductions from Joe Dante and Castle's daughter Terry. It also features its own version of "Emergo" in which the skeleton appears to readers via a "flip page" method. Mondo Media re-released the film 2015 as part of his Mondo X Chiller series on 28 March 2015 in the Alamo Drafthouse in Yonkers, New York.

Reception and legacy
On Rotten Tomatoes the film has received a fresh 78% rating based on 40 retrospective reviews with an average rating of 7.10/10. Allmovie has praised the film retrospectively, writing, "Campy and creepy in equal measures, House on Haunted Hill deserves its status as a horror classic."

The film was also spoofed by RiffTrax on February 9, 2009.

Remakes
The film was remade as the 1999 film House on Haunted Hill, which had a 2007 sequel titled Return to House on Haunted Hill. The 1999 film was released to middling reviews but was a box office success, while the 2007 sequel was direct-to-video and widely panned.

As of 2017, another remake is in development along with a prequel to the original film, with the latter being written by Castle's daughter Terry Castle.

See also
 List of American films of 1959
 List of ghost films

References

External links

 
 
 
 
 
 House on Haunted Hill on VincentPrice.org

1959 independent films
1959 horror films
1959 films
Allied Artists films
American haunted house films
American black-and-white films
1950s English-language films
Films directed by William Castle
American independent films
Films set in country houses
Films with screenplays by Robb White
Articles containing video clips
1950s ghost films
Films shot in Los Angeles
American exploitation films
1950s American films